Raben Group is a Dutch logistics company group. Its operations include contract logistics, warehousing, international road forwarding, domestic distribution, sea and air freight, intermodal transport and logistics services for fresh products (Fresh Logistics).

The first company established by the Raben family started its operations in Meddo/Winterswijk, Netherlands in 1931. Now, Raben Group operates in 15 countries: Netherlands, Poland, Germany, the Czech Republic, Slovakia, Hungary, Romania, Bulgaria, Austria, Ukraine, Greece, Lithuania, Latvia, Estonia, Italy and employs approximately 10,000 people. It has a network of depots in Europe, over 1,300,000 m2 of warehouse space and ca. 8,000 means of transport.

Raben Group companies 
 Raben Polska
 Raben Transport 
 Fresh Logistics
 Raben Logistics Czech
 Raben Eesti
 Raben Trans European Germany
 Raben Trans European Hungary
 Raben Latvia
 Raben Lietuva
 Raben Netherlands
 Raben Logistics Slovakia
 Raben Ukraine
 Eli Lagerhaus
 Fenthol & Sandtmann 
 Raben Management Services
 Spedition Weisshaupt
 Peter Spedition
 Spedition Balter und Zimmermann
 Spedition Balter
 Raben Bex (Austria)
 Raben Intertrans (Greece)
 Raben Bulgaria

History 
 1931 - J.W. Raben founded a transport company in the Netherlands
 1960 - T. Raben took over the helm of the company
 1991 - E. Raben opened Raben company in Poland
 2002 - Fresh Logistics established in Poland
 2003 - Raben company opened in Ukraine
 2004 - Raben companies opened in LT, LV and EE
 2005 - German company BSV became a member of Raben Group
 2007 - Raben Sea&Air started
 2008 - Setto (a family company operating in the Czech Republic and Slovakia) joined Raben Group
 2010 - Raben Logistics Hungary established
 2010 - Czech company Transkam became a member of Raben Group
 2011 - Raben Group announces acquisition of German Road Network and operations in the Czech Republic, Hungary, Poland and Slovakia from Wincanton
 2012 - Raben Trans European Czech (previously Wincanton) and Transkam – Logistics were united under the company Raben Logistics Czech s.r.o.
 2013 - Moving the activities of Raben Sea & Air to Raben Polska and Raben Transport
 2013 - Fresh Logistics joined European Food Network
 2014 - Raben Logistic Germany, Raben Trans European Germany, Eli Transport are merged into Raben Trans European Germany GmbH
 2015 - HRL Eurocargo, Balter Group and Spedition Weisshaupt  from Germany become a part of Raben Group
 2016 - Peter Spedition from Germany become a part of Raben Group
 2017 - Raben Romania opens
 2018 - Raben Trans European Germany
 2021 - Raben - celebrates 90 years of experience

References 

Logistics companies of the Netherlands
Winterswijk